Wolfe Park may refer to

 Wolfe Park, a public park in Monroe, Connecticut
 Wolfe Park (Columbus, Ohio), a neighborhood in Columbus, Ohio
 Wolfe Park (Manchester, New Hampshire), a neighborhood in Manchester, New Hampshire

See also
Wolf Park, of Battle Ground, Indiana